The 2013 Pacific-Asia Junior Curling Championships was held from January 10 to 16 at the Toroko Curling Club in Tokoro, Kitami, Japan. In the men's tournament, China defeated Korea with a score of 7–3 to secure a spot at the 2013 World Junior Curling Championships, while in the women's tournament, Japan defeated China with a score of 7–4 to secure a spot at the 2013 World Junior Curling Championships.

Men

Teams
The teams are listed as follows:

Round-robin standings
Final round-robin standings

Round-robin results
All draw times listed in Japan Standard Time (UTC+9).

Draw 1
Friday, January 11, 10:00

Draw 2
Friday, January 11, 16:00

Draw 3
Saturday, January 12, 10:00

Draw 4
Saturday, January 12, 16:00

Draw 5
Sunday, January 13, 10:00

Draw 6
Sunday, January 13, 16:00

Draw 7
Monday, January 14, 10:00

Draw 8
Monday, January 14, 16:00

Draw 9
Tuesday, January 15, 9:00

Draw 10
Tuesday, January 15, 14:30

Playoffs

Semifinal
Wednesday, January 16, 9:00

Final
Wednesday, January 16, 14:30

Women

Teams
The teams are listed as follows:

Round-robin standings
Final round-robin standings

Round-robin results
All draw times listed in Japan Standard Time (UTC+9).

Draw 1
Friday, January 11, 10:00

Draw 2
Friday, January 11, 16:00

Draw 3
Saturday, January 12, 10:00

Draw 4
Saturday, January 12, 16:00

Draw 5
Sunday, January 13, 10:00

Draw 6
Sunday, January 13, 16:00

Draw 7
Monday, January 14, 10:00

Draw 8
Monday, January 14, 16:00

Draw 9
Tuesday, January 15, 9:00

Draw 10
Tuesday, January 15, 14:30

Playoffs

Semifinal
Wednesday, January 16, 9:00

Final
Wednesday, January 16, 14:30

References

External links

Pacific-Asia Junior Championships
Pacific-Asia Junior Curling Championships
International curling competitions hosted by Japan
Pacific-Asia Junior Curling Championships
January 2013 sports events in Asia
Sport in Hokkaido